Dungditand is a village in Bokaro district  in the state of Jharkhand, India. Dungditand comes under tehsil of Chas.

Geography 
Dungditand is located at .It has an average elevation of 200 metres (655 feet). It is situated few kilometers away from National Highway 23 and National Highway 32.

Demographics 
The languages spoken include Hindi, Bengali, Kurmali, and Khortha language.

See also
List of cities in Jharkhand

References 

Cities and towns in Bokaro district